Phil Lundgren (2 January 1940 – 17 April 2015) was a British boxer. He competed in the men's featherweight event at the 1960 Summer Olympics.

Lundgren won the 1960 Amateur Boxing Association British featherweight title, when boxing out of the Fisher ABC.

References

External links
 

1940 births
2015 deaths
British male boxers
Olympic boxers of Great Britain
Boxers at the 1960 Summer Olympics
Boxers from Greater London
Featherweight boxers